Amy Fabé Dia Longo (born 14 February 1977) is a French-Italian sprint athlete who specializes in the 200 metres.

She became an Italian citizen on 12 May 2009 through her marriage to Italian middle-distance runner Andrea Longo.

Biography
Dia won the silver medal at the 1995 European Junior Championships. She competed at the 1995 World Indoor Championships, the 1998 European Championships, the 1999 World Indoor Championships, the 2001 World Indoor Championships, the 2001 World Championships, the 2002 European Indoor Championships and the 2002 European Championships without reaching the final. Then, she finally reached the final at the 2002 European Indoor Championships and finished sixth. She won the silver medal at the 2001 Mediterranean Games and the bronze medal at the 2005 Mediterranean Games.

In the 4 × 100 metres relay she finished fourth at the 2000 Olympic Games, and fourth at the 2005 World Championships. At the 1999 World Championships she ran in the heats, but not in the final.

Her personal best times are 7.33 seconds in the 60 metres (indoor), achieved in January 2000 in Eaubonne; 11.54 seconds in the 100 metres, achieved in June 2005 in Firenze; and 23.02 seconds in the 200 metres, achieved in June 1999 in Villeneuve-d'Ascq.

References

External links
 

1977 births
Living people
French female sprinters
Athletes (track and field) at the 2000 Summer Olympics
Olympic athletes of France
Italian female sprinters
French emigrants to Italy
Naturalised citizens of Italy
People from Creil
Mediterranean Games silver medalists for France
Mediterranean Games bronze medalists for France
Athletes (track and field) at the 2001 Mediterranean Games
Athletes (track and field) at the 2005 Mediterranean Games
Mediterranean Games medalists in athletics
Sportspeople from Oise